Ahmed Salah may refer to:

Hussein Ahmed Salah (born 1956), Olympic runner from Djibouti
Ahmad Salah Alwan (born 1982), Iraqi footballer
Ahmed Adam Salah (born 1966), Sudanese Olympic runner
Ahmed Salah (badminton) (born 1990), Egyptian badminton player
Ahmed Salah (volleyball) (born 1984), Egyptian volleyball player
Ahmed Gaid Salah (1940–2019), Algerian army officer
Ahmed Salah (swimmer) born 1986, Egyptian swimmer in 2006 African Swimming Championships
Ahmed Salah (Egypt), activist, co-founder of Kefaya